Belmont County is a county in the U.S. state of Ohio. As of the 2020 United States Census, the population was 66,497. Its county seat is St. Clairsville, while its largest city is Martins Ferry. The county was created on September 7, 1801, and organized on November 7, 1801. It takes its name from the French for "beautiful mountain".

Belmont County is part of the Wheeling, West Virginia metropolitan area.

History
Dille, Ohio, also known as Dilles Bottom, was located across the Ohio River from Moundsville, West Virginia. It was founded by the sons of David Dille (b. 1718) around 1790 and was initially a fort called Fort Dille.

Belmont County was authorized in September 1801 by the Northwest Territorial legislature, with area partitioned from Jefferson and Washington counties. The county would be organized two months later. Its area was reduced in 1810 when area was ceded for the formation of Guernsey County and again in 1813 for the formation of Monroe County. It has retained its boundaries unchanged since 1813. Saint Clairsville was named as the county seat in 1815.

Belmont is the French toponym meaning "beautiful mountain". Settlers migrating westward followed Zane's Trace through the county. Later, the National Road was built through the county.

Quakers were among the county's first settlers. Many of these people would become outspoken critics of slavery, including famous abolitionist Benjamin Lundy.

2018 blowout and methane leak 
In February 2018, an explosion and blowout in a natural gas well owned by XTO Energy was detected by the Copernicus Sentinel-5P satellite's Tropospheric Monitoring Instrument.

About 30 homes were evacuated near the gas well in York Township, and brine and produced water were discharged into streams flowing into the Ohio River.

The blowout lasted 20 days, releasing more than 50,000 tons of methane, a potent greenhouse gas, into the atmosphere. The blowout leaked more methane than is discharged by most European nations in a year from their oil and gas industries.

Geography

Belmont County lies on the east side of Ohio. Its east border abuts the west border of West Virginia (across the Ohio River). The Ohio flows southward along the county's east line. Captina Creek flows eastward through the lower part of the county, discharging into the Ohio at Powhatan Point, and McMahon Creek also flows eastward through the center of the county, discharging into the Ohio at Bellaire. The county terrain consists of low rolling hills, etched with drainages. All available area is devoted to agriculture. The terrain slopes to the east, with its highest point, Galloway Knob (1,396' or 426m ASL) at 1.2 mile (2 km) southeast of Lamira. The county has a total area of 541.27 sqmi (1492 km2), of which 532.13 sqmi (1378 km2) is land and 9.14 sqmi (23.69 km2) (1.7%) is water.

Adjacent counties

 Harrison County – north
 Jefferson County – northeast
 Ohio County, West Virginia – east
 Marshall County, West Virginia – southeast
 Monroe County – south
 Noble County – southwest
 Guernsey County – west

Major highways

Protected areas
 Barkcamp State Park
 Dysart Woods Natural Monument
 Egypt Valley Wildlife Area

Lakes
 Barnesville Lake
 Barnesville Reservoir #3
 Belmont Lake
 Piedmont Lake (part)

Demographics

2010 census
As of the 2010 United States Census, there were 70,400 people, 28,679 households, and 18,761 families in the county. The population density was 132.3/sqmi (51.1/km2). There were 32,452 housing units at an average density of 61.0/sqmi (23.55/km2). The racial makeup of the county was 94.0% white, 4.0% black or African American, 0.4% Asian, 0.1% American Indian, 0.2% from other races, and 1.3% from two or more races. Those of Hispanic or Latino origin made up 0.6% of the population. In terms of ancestry, 26.0% were German, 17.9% were Irish, 12.4% were English, 10.1% were Italian, 9.0% were Polish, and 6.2% were American.

Of the 28,679 households, 27.2% had children under the age of 18 living with them, 49.2% were married couples living together, 11.4% had a female householder with no husband present, 34.6% were non-families, and 29.9% of all households were made up of individuals. The average household size was 2.32 and the average family size was 2.85. The median age was 43.4 years.

The median income for a household in the county was $38,320 and the median income for a family was $47,214. Males had a median income of $42,022 versus $26,926 for females. The per capita income for the county was $20,266. About 12.1% of families and 15.2% of the population were below the poverty line, including 24.4% of those under age 18 and 9.1% of those age 65 or over.

2000 census
As of the 2000 United States Census, there were 70,226 people, 28,309 households, and 19,250 families in the county. The population density was 132.0/sqmi (50.96/km2). There were 31,236 housing units at an average density of 58.7/sqmi (22.66/km2). The racial makeup of the county was 94.98% White, 3.64% Black or African American, 0.14% Native American, 0.30% Asian, 0.02% Pacific Islander, 0.16% from other races, and 0.77% from two or more races. 0.39% of the population were Hispanic or Latino of any race. 20.2% were of German, 12.5% Irish, 12.0% American, 10.3% English, 10.2% Italian and 9.0% Polish ancestry according to Census 2000.

There were 28,309 households, out of which 28.30% had children under the age of 18 living with them, 53.10% were married couples living together, 11.20% had a female householder with no husband present, and 32.00% were non-families. 28.70% of all households were made up of individuals, and 15.10% had someone living alone who was 65 years of age or older. The average household size was 2.37 and the average family size was 2.90.

The county population contained 21.80% under the age of 18, 7.70% from 18 to 24, 27.40% from 25 to 44, 24.90% from 45 to 64, and 18.20% who were 65 years of age or older. The median age was 41 years. For every 100 females there were 96.40 males. For every 100 females age 18 and over, there were 93.60 males.

The median income for a household in the county was $29,714, and the median income for a family was $37,538. Males had a median income of $31,211 versus $19,890 for females. The per capita income for the county was $16,221. About 11.70% of families and 14.60% of the population were below the poverty line, including 20.40% of those under age 18 and 9.80% of those age 65 or over.

Politics
Belmont County is an Appalachian county in Southern Ohio, and as with many counties in this region was solidly Democratic from the Franklin D. Roosevelt administration through the 1990s. Back in the 19th Century the county frequently voted Republican, including voting for Lincoln in the 1860 election. Similar to counties in neighboring West Virginia and Kentucky, the Democratic margins began to shrink in the 2000s, and the county became reliably Republican by 2012.

|}

Government

Most of the county's government offices are located in the Belmont County Courthouse. Belmont County has a three-member board of county commissioners who administer and oversee the various county departments, similar to all but two of the 88 Ohio counties. The elected commissioners serve staggered four-year terms. As of 2019, Belmont County's elected commissioners are: Jerry Echemann (R), J.P. Dutton (R), and Josh Meyer (R).

Corrections
Belmont County is served by several detention centers located around St. Clairsville. The facility houses 2,698 inmates as of 2009. The Belmont County Jail in St. Clairsville is located near Belmont College and Ohio University Eastern Campus. The facility contains 144 beds and also houses the county sheriff's offices. The county is also served by Sargus Juvenile Detention Center, a 17-bed facility that also serves surrounding counties. Sargus Center is located next to the county jail.

Education

K-12
Belmont County is served by these local schools:

 Barnesville Exempted Village School District
 Bellaire High School
 Belmont County Educational Service Center
 Bridgeport High School
 Buckeye Local High School
 East Richland Christian School
 Harrison Central High School
 Martins Ferry High School
 Olney Friends School
 Saint Clairsville High School
 Shadyside High School
 Union Local High School
 Powhatan Elementary School in Powhatan Point

Higher education
 Belmont College
 Ohio University Eastern Campus

Communities

Cities
 Martins Ferry
 St. Clairsville (county seat)

Villages

 Barnesville
 Bellaire
 Belmont
 Bethesda
 Bridgeport
 Brookside
 Fairview
 Flushing
 Holloway
 Morristown
 Powhatan Point
 Shadyside
 Wilson
 Yorkville

Census-designated places

 Bannock
 Glencoe
 Lafferty
 Lansing
 Neffs
 Wolfhurst

Unincorporated communities

 Alledonia
 Anvil
 Armstrongs Mills
 Badgertown
 Barton
 Blaine
 Boston
 Businessburg
 Captina
 Centerville
 Colerain
 Crescent
 Dilles Bottom
 Egypt
 Fairpoint
 Farmington
 Hendrysburg
 Hunter
 Jacobsburg
 Key
 Lamira
 Lloydsville
 Maynard
 McClainville
 Pleasant Grove
 Riverview
 Sewellsville
 Somerton
 Steinersville
 Stewartsville
 Tacoma
 Temperanceville
 Uniontown
 Warnock

Townships

 Colerain
 Flushing
 Goshen
 Kirkwood
 Mead
 Pease
 Pultney
 Richland
 Smith
 Somerset
 Union
 Warren
 Washington
 Wayne
 Wheeling
 York

Notable people
 James E. Boyd (1834–1906), mayor of Omaha and the seventh governor of Nebraska
 William Boyd (1895–1972), film and radio actor, portrayed Western character Hopalong Cassidy from 1935 to 1954
 Don Fleming (1937–1963), a graduate of Shadyside High School, played football for the University of Florida and the Cleveland Browns.
 Joey Galloway (1971), a graduate of Bellaire High School, played football for Ohio State and in the NFL for 15 years.
 John Havlicek (1940–2019), a graduate of Bridgeport High School, played basketball for Ohio State and the Boston Celtics in the NBA. Elected to Hall of Fame.
 Bushrod Johnson (1817–1880), one of the few Confederate States of America generals born in the North, was born in Belmont County.
 Lance Mehl (1958), born in Bellaire. NFL football player
 Stan Olejniczak (1912–1979), born in Neffs. NFL football player
 Wilson Shannon (1802–1877), first native-born governor of Ohio
 Drusilla Wilson (1815–1908), temperance leader and Quaker preacher

See also
 National Register of Historic Places listings in Belmont County, Ohio

References

Further reading
 Thomas William Lewis, History of Southeastern Ohio and the Muskingum Valley, 1788–1928. In Three Volumes. Chicago: S.J. Clarke Publishing Co., 1928.

External links

 Belmont County Government's website
 Belmont County Economic Development
 Belmont County Port Authority

 
Ohio counties on the Ohio River
Appalachian Ohio
Counties of Appalachia
1815 establishments in Ohio